Outlier is a ballet made by Wayne McGregor for New York City Ballet to Thomas Adès' Violin Concerto (Concentric Paths), Op. 24 (2005). The premiere  was Saturday, 14 May 2010 at the David H. Koch Theater, Lincoln Center, New York. 

Concentric Paths, subtitle of the concerto for violin and chamber orchestra, refers to outliers who remain peripheral to actors having a common center. There is harmonious dance within the circle until an outlier intrudes, creating conflict among the men with regard to the women. The lighting is coded for mood: red for strong emotions, yellow for tranquil, grey for somber. The grouping of dancers in three movements reflects the triadic nature of the score.

Casts

Original 

   
 Ashley Bouder
 Sterling Hyltin
 Maria Kowroski
 Tiler Peck
 Wendy Whelan
 
 Adrian Danchig-Waring
 Joaquín De Luz
 Robert Fairchild
 Gonzalo Garcia
 Craig Hall
 Amar Ramasar

Reviews 

 NY Times, Alastair Macaulay, 16 May 2010
 NY Times, Alastair Macaulay, 3 February 2011

Ballets by Wayne McGregor
Ballets to the music of Thomas Adès
2010 ballet premieres
New York City Ballet repertory